Maran is an honorific title for exceptionally respected rabbis who are considered influential teachers and leaders. The term is more prevalent among Sephardi Jews, but it is also widely used by Ashkenazi Haredi Jews. It is an Aramaic word used frequently in the Talmud, meaning 'our master' ('our master'). 

The most common use of the term is in reference to "Maran Beth Yosef", Yosef Karo. In fact, when used without further qualification, Maran typically refers to Karo. Amongst contemporary rabbis, Yosef Shalom Eliashiv and Ovadia Yosef are most closely associated with the honorific.

In contemporary parlance Maran is often attributed to Rabbis who serve as founding heads of a particular ideological/cultural movement.  This use is usually limited to communication within that particular movement. For example, within their respective communities Elazar Shach (Maran HaRav Shach) and  Joel Teitelbaum often receive the title.

As with most honorifics, this title precedes the name: for example, one might say "Maran Rabbi Ovadia Yosef". Similarly to honorifics like doctor, it can also be used for direct addressing by itself when there is no ambiguity. When used with a name, it will almost always be followed by the (technically redundant) "Rabbi", as in the above example. It is never preceded by "the" in correct usage, though some journalists will make that mistake.

See also
Honorifics in Judaism
Mar
Maranatha

Orthodox rabbinic roles and titles
Aramaic words and phrases
Religious honorifics